U-73 may refer to one of the following German submarines:

 , a Type UE I submarine launched in 1915 and that served in World War I until scuttled on 30 October 1918
 During World War I, Germany also had these submarines with similar names:
 , a Type UB III submarine launched in 1917 and surrendered on 21 November 1918; broken up at Brest, France, in July 1921
, a Type UC II submarine launched in 1916 and surrendered on 6 January 1919; broken up at Brighton Ferry in 1919–20
, a Type VIIB submarine that served in World War II until sunk on 16 December 1943

Submarines of Germany